Methane clumped isotopes are methane molecules that contain two or more rare isotopes. Methane (CH4) contains two elements, carbon and hydrogen, each of which has two stable isotopes. For carbon, 98.9% are in the form of carbon-12 (12C) and 1.1% are carbon-13 (13C); while for hydrogen, 99.99% are in the form of protium (1H) and 0.01% are deuterium (2H or D). Carbon-13 (13C) and deuterium (2H or D) are rare isotopes in methane molecules. The abundance of the clumped isotopes provides information independent from the traditional carbon or hydrogen isotope composition of methane molecules.

Introduction 
Isotopologues are molecules that have the same chemical composition, but differ only in their isotopic composition. Methane has ten stable isotopologues: 12CH4, 13CH4, 12CH3D, 13CH3D, 12CH2D2, 13CH2D2, 12CHD3, 13CHD3, 12CD4 and 13CD4, among which, 12CH4 is an unsubstituted isotopologue; 13CH4 and 12CH3D are singly substituted isotopologues; 13CH3D and 12CH2D2 are doubly substituted isotopologues. The multiple-substituted isotopologues are clumped isotopologues.

The absolute abundance of each isotopologue primarily depends on the traditional carbon and hydrogen isotope compositions (δ13C and δD) of the molecules. Clumped isotope composition is calculated relative to the random distribution of carbon and hydrogen isotopes in the methane molecules. The deviations from the random distribution is the key signature of methane clumped isotope (please see "notation" for details).

In thermodynamic equilibrium, methane clumped isotopologue composition has a monotonic relationship with formation temperature. This is the condition for many geological environments so that methane clumped isotope can record its formation temperature, and therefore can be used to identify the origins of methane. When methane clumped-isotope composition is controlled by kinetic effects, for example, for microbial methane, it has the potential to be used to study metabolism.

The study of methane clumped isotopologues is very recent. The first mass spectrometry measurement of methane clumped isotopologues of natural abundance was made in 2014. This is a very young and fast-growing field.

Assuming isotopes are randomly distributed throughout all isotopologues and isotopes are of natural abundance.

Notation

Δ notation 
The Δ notation of clumped isotopes is an analogue to δ notation of traditional isotopes (e.g. δ13C, δ18O, δ15N, δ34S and δD).

The notation of traditional isotopes are defined as:

‰

 is the ratio of the rare isotope to the abundant isotope in the sample.  is the same ratio in the reference material.

The Δ notation is inherited from traditional δ notation. But the reference is not a physical reference material. Instead, the reference frame is defined as the stochastic distribution of isotopologues in the sample. It means the values of Δ are to denote the excess or deficit of the isotopologue relative to the amount expected if a material conforms to the stochastic distribution.

The calculation of stochastic distribution of methane isotopologues:

where  is defined as the abundance of 13CH3D molecules relative to 12CH4 molecules in random distribution;  is defined as the abundance of 12CH2D2 molecules relative to 12CH4 molecules in random distribution;  calculates the abundance of deuterium relative to protium in all methane molecules;  calculates the abundance of carbon-13 relative to carbon-12 in all methane molecules.

The calculation of deviation from the random distribution:

where the actual abundance of 13CH3D molecules relative to 12CH4 molecules, and the actual abundance of 12CH2D2 molecules relative to 12CH4 molecules are calculated as follows:

The two Δ formulas are frequently used to report the abundance of clumped isotopologues of methane.

The reason for choosing stochastic distribution as the reference frame may be historical - in the process of developing CO2 clumped isotope measurement, the only material with known clumped isotope abundance was CO2 heated to 1000 °C. However, this reference frame is a good choice. Because the absolute abundance of each isotopologue primarily depends on the bulk carbon and hydrogen isotope compositions (δ13C and δD) of the molecules, i.e. very close to stochastic distribution. Therefore, the deviation from the stochastic distribution, which is the key information embedded in the methane clumped isotopologues, is denoted by Δ values.

Mass-18 notation 
Under some circumstances, the abundances of 13CH3D and 12CH2D2 isotopologues are only measured as a sum, which leads to the notation for isotopologues of mass-18 (i.e. 13CH3D and 12CH2D2):

Inferred equilibration temperature 
When a Δ value is smaller than zero, there is no inferred equilibration temperature associated with it. Because at any finite temperature, the equilibrium Δ value is always positive.

Physical chemistry

Equilibrium thermodynamics 
When formed or re-equilibrated in reversible reactions, methane molecules can exchange isotopes with each other or with other substances present, such as H2O, H2 and CO2, and reach internal isotopic equilibrium. As a result, clumped isotopologues are enriched relative to the stochastic distribution.  and  values of methane in internal isotopic equilibrium are predicted and verified to vary as monotonic functions of temperature of equilibration as follows:

Δ values are in permil (‰).

Similar relationship also applies to :

Based on these correlations,  and  can be used as a geothermometer to indicate the formation temperature of methane (and ).

Kinetic isotope effects 
Kinetic isotope effect (KIE) occurs in irreversible reactions, such as methanogenesis, and can deviate methane clumped isotopologue composition from its thermodynamic equilibrium. Normally, KIE significantly drives  and  lower than their equilibrium states and even to negative values (i.e. more depleted of clumped isotopologues than stochastic distribution. Such lower  and  values correspond to apparent formation temperatures that are significantly higher than actual formation temperature, or to no possible temperatures (when a Δ value is smaller than zero, there is no inferred equilibration temperature associated with it).

Mixing effect 
Such non-linearity can be a diagnostic signature for mixing if multiple samples of various mixing ratios can be measured. When end-members have similar δ13C or δD compositions, the non-linearity is negligible.

Measurement techniques

Mass spectrometry 
On an isotope-ratio mass spectrometer, the measurement of clumped isotopologues has to be conducted on intact methane molecules, instead of converting methane to CO2, H2 or H2O. High mass resolution is required to distinguish different isotopologues of very close relative molecular mass (same "cardinal mass", e.g. 13CH4 and 12CH3D (17.03465 Da (Daltons) versus 17.03758 Da), 13CH3D and 12CH2D2 (18.04093 Da versus 18.04385 Da). Currently, two commercial models capable of such measurement are Thermo Scientific 253 Ultra and the Panorama by Nu Instruments.

Infrared spectroscopy 
Tunable infrared laser direct absorption spectroscopy (TILDAS) has been developed to measure the abundance of 13CH3D with two continuous wave quantum cascade lasers.

Theoretical studies 
There have been several theoretical studies on equilibrium thermodynamics of methane clumped isotopologues since 2008. These studies are based on ab initio, from underlying physical chemistry principles, and do not rely on empirical, or lab-based, data.

Ma et al. utilized first-principle quantum mechanism molecular calculation (Density Functional Theory, or DFT) to study the temperature dependence of the 13CH3D abundance. Cao and Liu estimated  and  based on statistical mechanics. Webb and Miller combined path-integral Monte Carlo methods with high-quality potential energy surfaces to more rigorously compute equilibrium isotope effects of  compared to Urey model using reduced partition function ratios. Piasecki et al. performed first-principles calculations of the equilibrium distributions of all substituted isotopologues of methane.

Distribution in nature

Geosphere 
Many studies have observed composition of thermogenic methane in equilibria. However, some thermogenic methane samples have clumped-isotope temperatures that are unrealistically high. Possible explanations for exceedingly high clumped isotope temperatures include natural gas migration after formation, mixing effect, and kinetic isotope effect of secondary cracking.

Biosphere 
Methanogenesis is a form of anaerobic respiration used by microbes, and microbial methanogenesis can occur in deep subsurface, marine sediments, freshwater bodies, etc. It appears that methane from deep subsurface and marine sediment is generally in internal isotopic equilibrium., while freshwater microbial methanogenesis expresses large kinetic isotope effect on methane clumped isotope composition.

There are two possible explanations for this variance: firstly, substrate limitation may enhance the reversibility of methanogenesis, thus allowing methane to achieve internal isotopic equilibrium via rapid hydrogen exchange with water; secondly, activation of C-H bonds during anaerobic oxidation precedes reversibly such that C-H bonds are broken and reformed faster than the net rate of methane consumption and methane can be reequilibrated.

Experimental studies

Calibration of equilibrium thermodynamics 
Theoretical calculations have predicted  and  values of methane in internal isotopic equilibrium. As there are assumptions and approximations in calculations, the equilibrium distribution is only experimentally validated after the analysis of samples brought to thermodynamic equilibrium. Nickel and platinum catalysts have been used to equilibrate methane C-H bonds at various temperatures from 150 to 500 °C in laboratory. Currently, catalytic equilibration is also the practice to develop the reference material for clumped isotope analysis .

Microbial culture 
Hydrogenotrophic methanogens utilize CO2 and H2 to produce methane by the following reaction:

 CO2 + 4H2 → CH4 + 2H2O

Acetoclastic methanogens metabolize acetate acid and produce methane:

 CH3COOH → CH4 + CO2

In laboratories, clumped isotope compositions of methane generated by hydrogenotrophic methanogens, acetoclastic methanogens (biodegradation of acetate), and methylotrophic methanogens are universally out of equilibria. It has been proposed that the reversibility of methanogenic enzyme is key to the kinetic isotope effect expressed in biogenic methane.

Pyrolysis of larger organic molecules 
Both pyrolysis of propane and closed-system hydrous pyrolysis of organic matter generate methane of  consistent with experimental temperatures. Closed-system nonhydrous pyrolysis of coal yields non-equilibrium distribution of methane isotopologues.

Sabatier reaction 
Methane synthesized by Sabatier reaction is largely depleted in CH2D2 and slightly depleted in 13CH3D relative to the equilibrium state. It has been proposed that quantum tunneling effects result in the low  observed in the experiment.

Applications

Distinguishing origins of natural gas 
Biogenic, thermogenic and abiotic methane is formed at different temperatures, which can be recorded in clumped isotope compositions of methane. Combined with conventional carbon and hydrogen isotope fingerprints and gas wetness (the abundance of low molecular weight hydrocarbon), methane clumped isotope can be used to identify the origins of methane in different types of natural gas accumulations.

Biogeochemistry of microbial methane 

In freshwater environments, significant kinetic isotope effect leads to a wide range of observed  and  values, which has the potential to provide insights into methanogenesis rate and chemical condition in the corresponding environments.

See also 

 Methane
 Isotope
 Carbon isotopes
 Hydrogen isotopes
 Isotopic signature
 Isotope geochemistry
 Isotopologue
 Isotopomer
 Clumped isotopes
 Isotope-ratio mass spectrometry
 Hydrogen isotope geochemistry of natural gas
 Methanogenesis
 Kinetic isotope effect

References 

Methane
Isotope separation
Deuterated compounds